John George Schmitz (August 12, 1930 – January 10, 2001) was a Republican member of the United States House of Representatives and California State Senate from Orange County, California.  He was also a member of the John Birch Society.  In 1972 he was the candidate for President of the United States of the American Independent Party, later known as the American Party.

Schmitz was notable for his extreme right-wing sympathies and for his slurs against African-Americans, Hispanics, Jews and homosexuals. By one measure, he was found to be the third-most conservative member of Congress between 1937 and 2002, and the ultra-conservative John Birch Society, of which Schmitz was a longtime leader, later expelled him for extremist rhetoric.

On October 25, 1971, Schmitz composed an introduction to the highly controversial book None Dare Call It Conspiracy written by Gary Allen with Larry Abraham.

In 1982, after it was revealed—and Schmitz admitted—that he had engaged in an extra-marital affair and fathered two children with one of his former college students, Schmitz's career as a politician effectively ended, as did his wife Mary's as a conservative political commentator. His seven children with his wife include politicians John P. Schmitz and Joseph E. Schmitz, and teacher Mary Kay Letourneau convicted in 1997 of child sexual abuse.

Schmitz died in 2001 at the age of 70 from prostate cancer; the former Marine Colonel was buried with full military honors at Arlington National Cemetery.

Early life and military career
Schmitz was born in Milwaukee, the son of Wilhelmina (Frueh) and Jacob John Schmitz. Schmitz graduated from Marquette University High School in 1948. He obtained his B.S. degree from Marquette University in Milwaukee in 1952 and an M.A. from California State University, Long Beach, in 1960. He served as a United States Marine Corps jet fighter and helicopter pilot from 1952 to 1960, and was a lieutenant colonel in the United States Marine Corps Reserve from 1960 to 1983. Schmitz was Catholic.

Early career
After leaving the Marines, Schmitz took a job as an instructor in philosophy and political science at Santa Ana College. He also became active in the John Birch Society. His views attracted the attention of wealthy Orange County conservatives such as fast-food magnate Carl Karcher, sporting goods heir Willard Voit and San Juan Capistrano rancher Tom Rogers.

They helped him win election to the California Senate in 1964 from a district in Orange County. His views were very conservative even by the standards of Orange County. Schmitz once joked that he had joined the John Birch Society in order to court the moderate vote in Orange County. He opposed sex education in public schools. He believed citizens should be able to carry loaded guns in their cars. He was also critical of the civil unrest that characterized the mid-1960s. He called the Watts riots of 1965 "a Communist operation," and a year later sponsored a bill, which failed to pass, to investigate the backgrounds of teachers suspected of Communist affiliations. He also believed that state universities should be sold to private corporations as a curb against student protests.

US Representative and presidential campaign
Schmitz served in the state senate until 1970, when he won a special election to succeed the late James B. Utt in the House from California's 35th congressional district. He won a full term in November.

When Richard M. Nixon, whose permanent residence at the time was in San Clemente—located in Schmitz's district— first went to China in 1972, Schmitz was asked if he supported President Nixon's going to China. Schmitz replied, "I didn't care that Nixon went to China, I was only upset that he came back." Nixon recruited Orange County Tax Assessor Andrew J. Hinshaw, a more mainstream Republican, to run against Schmitz in the Republican primary for the renumbered 39th District. Schmitz was the California Chairman of John M. Ashbrook's 1972 Presidential Campaign. 

Angry at Nixon's role in his defeat and Nixon's perceived pivot to the left, Schmitz changed his party registration to the American Independent after being nominated as their candidate for president in the 1972 election; Tom Anderson of Tennessee was his running mate. The pair received 1,100,868 votes for 1.42% of the total. Three-time Academy Award winner and fellow John Birch Society member Walter Brennan helped Schmitz with his campaign, serving as finance chairman. Schmitz' best showings were in the West. He received 9.30 percent of the vote in Idaho, where he finished second ahead of Democrat George McGovern in the archconservative Mormon counties of Fremont, Jefferson, Madison and Lemhi. In Jefferson County Schmitz achieved the best result for a third-party presidential candidate in any non-Southern county since 1936 when William Lemke passed twenty-eight percent of the vote in the North Dakota counties of Burke, Sheridan and Hettinger. Schmitz received 7.25 percent in Alaska, 5.97 percent in Utah, and between four and five percent in Oregon, Montana, Washington State and also Louisiana.

Return to the State Senate
Schmitz won the District 36 state senate seat in 1978, with 49.5% of the vote, and subsequently was named chairman of the Constitutional Amendments Committee.

In 1981, Schmitz—who was staunchly anti-abortion—chaired a committee hearing on abortion. Feminist attorney Gloria Allred testified at the hearing in support of the pro-abortion rights position, and afterward sarcastically presented Schmitz with a black leather chastity belt. Schmitz's committee then issued a press release under the headline, "Senator Schmitz and His Committee Survive Attack of the Bulldykes", describing the hearing room as filled with "hard, Jewish and (arguably) female faces." Allred sued Schmitz for libel, claiming $10 million in damages, but settled for $20,000 and an apology. In his apology, Schmitz stated, "I have never considered her (Allred) to be ... a slick, butch lawyeress." Allred later appeared at a press conference called by Senator Schmitz regarding Mid-East issues, handed Schmitz a box of frogs and shouted, "A plague on the House of Schmitz!"

The incident cost him his committee chairmanship and the John Birch Society stripped him of his membership for "extremism." Despite this, Schmitz announced plans to run for the Republican nomination for the United States Senate in 1982.

Extramarital affair and fall-out
Early in 1982, J George Stuckle, an infant born on June 10, 1981, was treated at an Orange County hospital for an injured penis. A piece of hair was wrapped so tightly around the organ—"in a square knot," according to one doctor—that it was almost severed. The surgery went well and the baby suffered no permanent injury. However, the baby's mother, Carla Stuckle, a 43-year-old Swedish-born immigrant and longtime Republican volunteer, was not allowed to take John George home since some of the attending doctors were convinced the hair had been deliberately tied around his penis. Detectives threatened to arrest Carla and take J George away permanently unless she identified the father. Carla then identified Schmitz as John George's father.

During a custody hearing, Schmitz acknowledged fathering John George out of wedlock. He was also the father of Carla's daughter, E. The admission effectively ended his political career, though he made an unsuccessful run for the 38th Congressional District in 1984. He was defeated by former Congressman Bob Dornan in the Republican primary 65% to 11%, with another candidate earning 24%. Dornan would go on to defeat Democratic incumbent Rep. Jerry M. Patterson in November.

Schmitz's affair also ended his wife Mary's career as a political commentator on television, where she advocated from the conservative position on the political roundtable debate show Free for All. (Before entering television, Mary had already become known as the "West Coast Phyllis Schlafly", having campaigned vigorously against the Equal Rights Amendment.) The Schmitzes briefly separated over the affair but reconciled.

Schmitz never financially supported nor helped raise his two children with Carla Stuckle. When the detective investigating the possible child abuse claim against Stuckle confronted Schmitz about fathering J George, Schmitz confirmed parentage and reportedly told the officer, "I do not and will not support him financially. It is her [Carla Stuckle's] responsibility to take care of him." Stuckle was not charged with any crime, and authorities returned J George to his care. Stuckle raised both J George and E on her own, working long hours at two different jobs. In 1994, when J George and E were 11 and 13 respectively, Carla Stuckle died from complications of Type I diabetes. Schmitz refused custody of the children. Mary Schmitz's close friend, high-profile astrologer and alleged psychic Jeane Dixon, took in the children. When Dixon died in 1997, the children became wards of the state and went to an orphanage.

Death
Schmitz died of prostate cancer at the age of 70 on January 10, 2001.  Following a packed funeral service at the Fort Myer post chapel, he was buried with full military honors at Arlington National Cemetery.

An obituary printed in the Journal of Historical Review, a publication of the organization the Institute for Historical Review, described Schmitz as a "good friend of the Institute." Schmitz attended at least two IHR Conferences, and was a subscriber for many years to the Journal."

Children
By wife Mary:
 John P. Schmitz (born 1955): Deputy Counsel to the Vice President (George H. W. Bush) during Reagan administration; Deputy Counsel to the President, George H. W. Bush administration.
 Joseph E. Schmitz (born 1956): Department of Defense Inspector General, George W. Bush administration; Chief Operating Officer and Chief Legal Counsel, Blackwater.
 Mary Kay Letourneau (born 1962, died 2020), former schoolteacher and child rapist.
 Philip (born 1970, died 1973)
 Jerome
 Theresa
 Elizabeth

Children by Carla Stuckle:
 John ####### (born John George Stuckle; June 10, 1981)
 Eugenie ####### (born Eugenie Stuckle)

Electoral history
California's 35th congressional district special election, 1970
 John G. Schmitz (R) – 103,127 (49.30%)
 David N. Hartman (D) – 19,163 (9.16%)
 John A. Steiger (R) – 30,191 (14.43%)
 William M. Wilcoxen (R) – 27,016 (12.91%)
 Thomas Lenhart (R) – 16,378 (7.83%)
 John D. Ratterree (R) – 7,881 (3.77%)
 Maggie Meggs (R) – 5,440 (2.60%)

Note: All candidates ran in the same primary. Since no candidate won a majority, the top two finishers from both parties (Schmitz and Hartman) went to a runoff election.

California's 35th congressional district special election, 1970 (Runoff)
 John G. Schmitz (R) – 67,209 (72.37%)
 David N. Hartman (D) – 25,655 (27.63%)

California's 35th congressional district election, 1970
 John G. Schmitz (R) (inc.) – 192,765 (67.04%)
 Thomas Lenhart (D) – 87,019 (30.27%)
 Francis R. Halpern (Peace & Freedom) – 7,742 (2.69%)

California's 35th congressional district Republican primary election, 1972
 Andrew J. Hinshaw – 42,782 (45.63%)
 John G. Schmitz – 40,261 (42.94%)
 Earl H. Carraway – 9,116 (9.72%)
 Larry Denna – 1,597 (1.70%)

1972 American Independent Party National Convention
 John G. Schmitz – 330 (71.74%)
 George L. Garfield – 56 (12.17%)
 Allen Grear – 26 (5.65%)
 Thomas J. Anderson – 24 (5.22%)
 Richard B. Kay – 16 (3.48%)
 George Wallace – 8 (1.74%)

1972 United States presidential election
 Richard Nixon/Spiro Agnew (Republican) – 47,168,710 (60.7%) and 520 electoral votes (49 states carried)
 George McGovern/Sargent Shriver (Democratic) – 29,173,222 (37.5%) and 17 electoral votes (1 state and D.C. carried)
 John Hospers/Theodora Nathan (Libertarian) – 3,674 votes (00.0%) and 1 electoral vote (faithless elector)
 John G. Schmitz/Thomas J. Anderson (American Independent) – 1,100,868 (1.4%) and 0 electoral votes

Republican primary for the United States Senate from California, 1980
 Paul Gann - 934,433 (40.00%)
 Sam Yorty - 668,583 (28.62%)
 John G. Schmitz - 442,839 (18.96%)
 James A. Ware - 95,155 (4.07%)
 Rayburn D. Hanzlick - 76,268 (3.27%)
 Philip Schwartz - 68,790 (2.95%)
 Brian Hyndman - 50,122 (2.15%)

Republican primary for the United States Senate from California, 1982
 Pete Wilson - 851,292 (37.54%)
 Pete McCloskey - 577,267 (25.46%)
 Barry Goldwater, Jr. - 408,308 (18.01%)
 Bob Dornan - 181,970 (8.03%)
 Maureen Reagan - 118,326 (5.22%)
 John G. Schmitz - 48,267 (2.13%)
 Ted Bruinsma - 37,762 (1.67%)

Publications

Books
 Stranger in the Arena. Santa Ana, Calif.: Rayline Printing Co. (1974).

Book contributions
 Introduction to None Dare Call It Conspiracy, by Gary Allen and Larry H. Abraham. Seal Beach, Calif.: Concord Press (1972), pp. 5-6.

Articles
 "Abortionism: The Growing Cult of Baby Murder." American Opinion, vol. 17, no. 3 (March 1974), pp. 1-8.

See also
List of federal political sex scandals in the United States
List of members of the House Un-American Activities Committee
List of members of the American Legion

References

Further reading
 Stang, Alan (1972). "John Schmitz: America's Conservative Congressman." Belmont, Mass.: American Opinion.
 Steinbacher, John (1972). John Schmitz and the American Party.
 Gregor Brand: John G. Schmitz. US-Politiker und Professor, Nachfahre eines Auswanderers aus Rommersheim

External links

Join California: John Schmitz
John G. Schmitz Memorial Website
Guide to the John G. Schmitz Campaign Materials at University of California, Irvine

|-

1930 births
2001 deaths
20th-century American politicians
20th-century far-right politicians in the United States
American Independent Party presidential nominees
American people of German descent
Burials at Arlington National Cemetery
California Independents
California state senators
California State University, Long Beach alumni
Catholics from California
Catholics from Wisconsin
Deaths from cancer in Maryland
Deaths from prostate cancer
John Birch Society members
Marquette University alumni
Military personnel from Milwaukee
Politicians from Milwaukee
Republican Party members of the United States House of Representatives from California
United States Marine Corps officers
Candidates in the 1972 United States presidential election
Marquette University High School alumni
American anti-communists
American conspiracy theorists
Right-wing populism in the United States
New Right (United States)
American Holocaust deniers
Antisemitism in the United States
Discrimination against LGBT people in the United States